James Kinloch (died November 1962) was a Scottish footballer who played as an inside right.

Career
Born in Glasgow, Kinloch played club football for Queen's Park and Partick Thistle, and made one appearance for Scotland in 1922. He won the Scottish Cup in 1921 with Partick Thistle, and later served as chairman of the club. He is a member of the club's Hall of Fame.

References

Year of birth missing
1962 deaths
Scottish footballers
Scotland international footballers
Queen's Park F.C. players
Partick Thistle F.C. players
Association football inside forwards
Date of death missing
Place of death missing
Footballers from Glasgow
Chairmen and investors of football clubs in Scotland
Scottish Football League players